Ridgeley High School, built in 1934, was a middle and a high school in Mineral County, West Virginia. The high school closed in 1976 because of consolidation of the Mineral County Schools district.  At one time the school contained kindergarten though 12th grade.

History
Ridgeley students received their high school education at Allegany High School in Cumberland, Maryland until 1934, when a high school program was established in the town. The first graduating class in 1935 had 13 students.

The school closed as a result of consolidation in 1976 and was succeeded by Frankfort High School.

Campus
Ridgeley High School sits on a plot of land in the center of the town by the levee which separates the property from the Potomac River. The building is a two-story school with L-shaped hallways on both levels. On the lower level (essentially the basement) classrooms lined the front of the school and the side facing the football field. The cafeteria was at the center of the L in the basement. Aside from lunches, the space was used for weekly sock hops on Friday nights providing entertainment to students. On the upper floor, classrooms lined the outer walls facing the street. On the football field side, classrooms lined both sides of the hallway. The other side of the hall was mostly occupied by the gym where basketball games were played. Outside, the football field took up a large portion of the property. The football stadium had no lights, so games were played on Friday afternoons with students released early to attend. The property behind the school was also used by gym classes for calisthenics. The football field was also used for years by other local sports teams including the Ridgeley Rams football team.

The building was demolished over two weeks beginning on October 22, 2018.

Extracurricular activities
The Ridgeley Blackhawks football team won the West Virginia Class A championship in 1975.

Notable alumni
William E. Shuck, Jr., Congressional Medal of Honor recipient

Former principals
Festus W Smith (1934–38)
Melvin M Heiskell (1938–68)
Golden Adkins (1968–76)

Gallery

References

Defunct schools in West Virginia
Educational institutions disestablished in 1976
Educational institutions established in 1934
Schools in Mineral County, West Virginia
1934 establishments in West Virginia
1976 disestablishments in West Virginia
Buildings and structures demolished in 2018